Journal of the American Geriatrics Society is a peer-reviewed journal of the American Geriatrics Society.

References

External links 
 Website

Wiley-Blackwell academic journals
English-language journals
Publications established in 2001
Academic journals associated with learned and professional societies of the United States
Gerontology journals